Albert Lincoln "Link" Washburn (June 15, 1911 – January 30, 2007) was an American geomorphologist studying permafrost. Washburn was a proficient skier participating in the 1936 Winter Olympics. Much of his work on permafrost was done in the Canadian arctic.

References

External links
 
 
 Reconnaissance geology of portions of Victoria Island and immediately adjacent regions, Arctic Canada Manuscript at Dartmouth College Library

Alpine skiers at the 1936 Winter Olympics
American geomorphologists
Quaternary geologists
1911 births
2007 deaths
American male alpine skiers
Olympic alpine skiers of the United States